{|

{{Infobox ship characteristics
| Hide header = 
| Header caption = 
| Ship class = 
| Ship displacement = 
| Ship length = 
| Ship beam = 
| Ship height = 
| Ship draught = 
| Ship draft = 
| Ship power =  (CODAG)
| Ship propulsion = 1 gas turbine, 2 diesels, 2 shafts
| Ship speed = *Economy 
Maximum 
| Ship range =  at 15 knots
| Ship endurance = *21 days with logistic support
10 days autonomous
| Ship complement = 93 including aviation officers, with accommodation for up to 106
| Ship sensors = *GENESIS CMS
SMART-S Mk2 search radar
Sonar, GPS, LAN, ECDIS
UniMACS 3000 IPMS
X-band radar, Fire control radar
| Ship EW = Aselsan ARES-2N
Others: Laser/RF systems, ASW jammers, SSTD
| Ship armament = *Guns:
 1 ×  OTO Melara Super Rapid
 1 x 35 mm Aselsan GOKDENIZ
 2 × 12.7 mm Aselsan STAMP
Anti-surface missiles:
 8 × Harpoon
Anti-aircraft missiles:
 VL MICA-MTorpedoes:
 2 × 324 mm MU90 torpedoes
| Ship armour = 
| Ship armor = 
| Ship aircraft = 
| Ship aircraft facilities = *Hangar and platform for:
 S-70B Seahawk ASW helicopters
 Unmanned aerial vehicles (UAV)
| Ship notes = Capability of storing armaments, 20 tons of JP-5 aircraft fuel, aerial refueling (HIRF) and maintenance systems
}}
|}'Hetman Ivan Mazepa (F211)' is an  anti-submarine corvette of the Ukrainian Navy currently in the process of fitting out. The ship is named after Ivan Mazepa, a prominent Ukrainian Cossack leader who turned against the Tsardom of Russia of Peter the Great and joined the side of Charles XII of Sweden during the Swedish Invasion of Russia. 

The ship was officially laid down on 7 September 2021, and launched on 2 October 2022. When completed, the vessel will be the flagship of the Ukrainian Navy, and will be the first modern blue-water combat vessel of the service. 

 Development and Design 

 Context 
At the time of its modern inception in the 1990s, the Ukrainian Navy primarily consisted of naval vessels inherited from the Soviet Black Sea Fleet and Soviet Border Troops. These included Project 1135 Burevestnik frigates, Project 1124 Al'batros corvettes, Project 206MR Vikhr missile boats, and a number of other blue and brown water ships and auxiliary vessels. These ships were maintained and operated in close cooperation with the newly reconstituted Russian Federation, who had inherited the remainder of the Black Sea Fleet. However, the severe state of the Ukrainian economy in the years after independence resulted in the scrapping or sale of many vessels. 

 Cooperation with Turkey 
A revolution occurred at the beginning of 2014 in Ukraine, which deposed the pro-Russian government of Viktor Yanukovych. This resulted in a deterioration of relations between the new Ukrainian government and Russia, and further led to the Annexation of Crimea by the Russian Federation, which resulted in the seizure of the majority of the Ukrainian Navy, including major ships such as the corvettes Lutsk and Ternopil. The loss of the vast majority of these ships constituted a significant reduction in the combat capabilities of the Ukrainian Navy. As such, it became necessary to acquire new ships.  As part of these efforts, a memorandum was signed with Turkey which included both the purchase of Baykar Bayraktar TB2 attack drones and the construction of two corvettes, with an option for two more.

In December 2020, the head of the Turkish Defense Industry Department, Ismail Demir, signed an agreement with the Ministry of Defence of Ukraine on the construction of two corvettes of the Turkish MILGEM project (type Ada) for the Ukrainian Navy. Both corvettes were to be built in Turkey at the RMK Marine shipyard in Tuzla, Istanbul. The main contractor  was envisoned to be the Turkish state design company Savunma Teknolojileri Mühendislik ve Ticaret A.Ş. The cost of the first Ukrainian ship in class was estimated at approximately 8 billion hryvnia, without taking into account the fitout of weapons. Furthermore, two or three more corvettes were to be built under license in Ukraine at the Okean Shipyard in Mykolaiv.

 Proposed Armament 
Radio Free Europe/Radio Liberty, claimed on 09 August 2021, that the Ukraine Defence Ministry had revealed the weapon systems for the corvettes. The corvette would reportedly be equipped with American RGM-84 Harpoon anti-ship missiles. The Ukrainian developed R-360 Neptun, the Turkish ATMACA, and the American-Norwegian Naval Strike Missile had been other contenders. Statements at the time suggested the installation of Rheinmetall Oerlikon’s Millennium CIWS, but later image renders show the Aselsan-made Gokdeniz CIWS. French MICA missiles, launched from a VLS would be installed for air defence purposes. An OTO Melara 76 mm gun and 12.7 mm STAMP gun would be mounted. The primary ASW weapons was considered to be the MU90 torpedo.

 Construction 

 Launch 
Construction of the ship began on 28 April 2021, with the official laying ceremony taking place on 7 September 2021. The ship was launched by First Lady of Ukraine, Olena Zelenska on 2 October 2022. The Turkish Defence Minister Hulusi Akar attended the ceremony, along with President of Defence Industry Agency (SSB) Professor İsmail Demir, STM General Manager Özgür Güleryüz and Vice Admiral of the Ukrainian Navy Oleksiy Neizhpapa.

It was initially planned that the ship would be towed to Ukraine to complete its fitting out by the end of 2022 and in 2023, the corvette was planned to be fitted out, before sea trials could begin. However, due to the blockade of the Ukrainian coast by the Russian Black Sea Fleet, the fate of these plans remains unknown and the ship would likely be completed in Turkey.

 Naming 
On the decree of Ukrainian President Volodymyr Zelensky, the ship is named after Ivan Mazepa, a prominent Ukrainian Cossack leader who turned against the Tsardom of Russia led by Peter the Great and joined the side of Charles XII of Sweden during the Swedish Invasion of Russia. Following the scuttling of the Project 1135 frigate Hetman Sahaidachny, Ivan Mazepa'' is slated to become the flagship of the Ukrainian Navy.

Sea trials

Service history

Gallery

References

Ships built at Istanbul Naval Shipyard
Corvettes of the Ukrainian Navy